Crepidotus brunnescens, is a species of saprophytic fungus in the family Crepidotaceae with a stipeless sessile cap which is smooth and yellowish-brown.  It is often found on hardwood logs such as Quercus.

Description
Caps with a basal tomentum. Odor not distinctive. Clamps present in the pileipellis and the lamellar trama. Cheilocystidia is  hyaline and capitate. Basidia have four sterigmata. Spores brown, thick-walled, apparently smooth and subglobose. Spores: (5.4) 5.6 – 6.2 (6.8) × (4.9) 5.1 – 5.7 (6.2) µm.

References

Crepidotaceae